Edward (also, Ed, Ned, or Ted) McDonald may refer to:

Edward A. McDonald (born 1947), American attorney and actor
Edward F. McDonald (1844–1892), American politician
Edward Nathaniel McDonald (1832–1899), American businessman
Edward R. McDonald (1872–1952), Canadian adventurer, lawyer, politician, writer and inventor
Ed McDonald (Ontario politician), Communist Party candidate in the 1985 Ontario provincial election
Ed McDonald (baseball) (1886–1946), Major League Baseball third baseman
Ned McDonald (1910–1977), American football coach
Ted McDonald (1891–1937), Australian cricketer
Ted McDonald (footballer) (1876–1938), English footballer

See also
Edwin McDonald (1875–1919), Australian footballer
Edward MacDonald (fl. 2000s–2020s), Chair of the Faculty of Arts at the University of Prince Edward Island